Polystichum acrostichoides, commonly denominated Christmas fern, is a perennial, evergreen fern native to eastern North America, from Nova Scotia west to Minnesota and south to Florida and eastern Texas. It is one of the most common ferns in eastern North America, being found in moist and shady habitats in woodlands, stream banks and rocky slopes. The common name derives from the evergreen fronds, which are often still green at Christmas.

Description 
Christmas fern has a tufted, clumping habit, with its fronds arising from a central growth point. It can form colonies, but frequently grows singly or in twos or threes. In winter, the fertile fronds die; the sterile fronds remain through the winter, and are often flattened to the ground by low temperatures and snow cover. The frond is supported by a dark brown- to black-colored stipe, or stem, which is typically a quarter to a third of the overall frond length. The coiled, developing fronds ("crosiers") are scaly, greyish and prominent in early spring.

They have 20 to 35 pairs of pinnae. Each pinna is typically  and has a finely serrulate or spiny edge, and is oblong to falcate in shape. The fine teeth or spines on the edge of the pinna are oriented towards its tip. Each pinna has a small, triangular, "thumblike" lobe at its base. The light brown spores are produced on fertile pinnae, at the frond's tip, which are conspicuously smaller than the sterile pinnae further down the frond. These fertile pinnae can be described as "acrostichoid", given that the sporangia occupy most of the lower surface of the pinna.

Christmas fern resembles the Pacific Coast sword fern, Polystichum munitum, although forming less expansive tufts and differing from it and from almost all other ferns in that fertile pinnae of the Christmas fern are noticeably reduced in size relative to the sterile pinnae, while being located on the same frond.

P. acrostichoides is known to hybridize with Polystichum braunii in areas where their ranges overlap.

P. acrostichoides is parasitized by the fungus Taphrina polystichi, which causes yellowish to whitish galls on the fronds.

Cultivation 
Christmas fern is popular in cultivation as an ornamental plant for gardens, including natural gardens, as it is easy to cultivate in a range of environments and soils. Being evergreen, it sometimes used in winter-oriented garden design.

This fern can conserve soil and allay erosion of steep slopes. The fronds are semi-erect until the first killing frost, after which they lie prostrate on the ground and effectively hold in place the duff layer of the forest floor, enabling the gradual decomposition of the duff into humus, which in turn builds the soil.

Gallery

References

External links 

 
 USDA PLANTS Profile for Polystichum acrostichoides (Christmas fern)
 Flora of North America: Polystichum acrostichoides
 Flora of PA: Polystichum acrostichoides

acrostichoides
Garden plants of North America
Ferns of the Americas
Ferns of the United States